The VFF Champions League, formerly known as the VFF National Super League and the VFF Bred Cup, is the national league of Vanuatu.

The league is not fully professional.

Format 
Since 2016, the PVFA, Port Vila Football Association does not take part in this competition anymore. Which means that the top teams from seven Vanuatu football associations compete in 3 groups and the top two from each advance to the final round. The winner of the final round qualifies for the OFC Champions League.

The 7 Associations are:

List of champions

Performance by club
The performance of various clubs is shown in the following table:

Grand final
Played between the champions of the VFF Champions League and the Port Vila Top Four Super League.

See also
Port Vila Football League

References

 
Football leagues in Vanuatu
Top level football leagues in Oceania